Most of Lithuania's early castles were wooden and have not survived.  Those that remain are of stone and brick construction dating from the 13th century onwards.

List of castles and castle ruins in Lithuania

See also
List of castles in Belarus
List of castles in Ukraine
List of castles in Latvia
List of castles in Estonia
List of palaces and manor houses in Latvia
List of palaces and manor houses in Estonia
List of palaces and manor houses in Lithuania 
List of castles

External links
 Interactive map of Lithuanian castles and estates

Castles
Lithuania
Castles
Lists of castles by country
Castles